Miloš Kolaković (born 25 June 1974) is a Serbian former professional footballer who played as a striker.

Club career
After playing for Voždovac in the Serbian League Belgrade, Kolaković moved abroad to Germany and joined Regionalliga club Eintracht Braunschweig in the 1996 winter transfer window. He played 80 league games and scored 40 goals over the next two and a half seasons, securing him a transfer to Zweite Bundesliga side Arminia Bielefeld in the summer of 1998. Half a year later, Kolaković returned to Eintracht Braunschweig, spending another two and a half seasons with the club.

In the summer of 2001, Kolaković returned to his homeland and signed with OFK Beograd. He made 85 appearances and scored 21 goals in the First League of Serbia and Montenegro, before moving abroad for the second time and joining Hungarian side Debrecen in the 2005 winter transfer window, helping them win the title. During the 2006 winter transfer window, Kolaković returned to his homeland and joined Radnički Niš.

International career
Kolaković was capped three times for Serbia and Montenegro, making his international debut in a 1–1 friendly draw against Northern Ireland at Windsor Park in April 2004, less than two months shy of his 30th birthday. He also represented the country at the Kirin Cup in July 2004.

Career statistics

Honours
Debrecen
 Nemzeti Bajnokság I: 2004–05

References

External links
 
 
 
 

2. Bundesliga players
Arminia Bielefeld players
Association football forwards
Cypriot First Division players
Debreceni VSC players
Eintracht Braunschweig players
Expatriate footballers in Cyprus
Expatriate footballers in Germany
Expatriate footballers in Hungary
First League of Serbia and Montenegro players
FK Bežanija players
FK Radnički Niš players
FK Voždovac players
Footballers from Belgrade
Nea Salamis Famagusta FC players
Nemzeti Bajnokság I players
OFK Beograd players
Regionalliga players
Serbia and Montenegro expatriate footballers
Serbia and Montenegro expatriate sportspeople in Germany
Serbia and Montenegro expatriate sportspeople in Hungary
Serbia and Montenegro footballers
Serbia and Montenegro international footballers
Serbian expatriate footballers
Serbian expatriate sportspeople in Cyprus
Serbian footballers
Serbian SuperLiga players
1974 births
Living people